Ambassa railway station is a small railway station in Dhalai district, Tripura. Its code is ABSA. It serves Ambassa city. The station consists of 3 platforms.  One express train till 30 September 2014 used to run between Lumding and Agartala daily. The meter gauge track is converted to broad gauge.

Major Trains
 Agartala - Anand Vihar Terminal Tejas Rajdhani Express
 Agartala - Sir M. Visvesvaraya Terminal Humsafar Express
 Agartala - Firozpur Cantonment Tripura Sundari Express
 Agartala - Sealdah Kanchanjungha Express
 Agartala - Deoghar Weekly Express
 Agartala - Dharmanagar Passenger
 Silchar - Dharmanagar Passenger
 Agartala - Silchar Express

References

External links
 
 
 Indian railway fan club

Railway stations in Dhalai district
Lumding railway division